The hamlet of Blommerschot is located in the southeast of Oostmalle in the Campine region of Flanders, Belgium. Blommerschot was already mentioned in 1300 as Eene oude Ridderlyck hof (E: a noble court), and possibly dates back from a Frankish settlement. In the 17th century it was owned by Johan de Proost, Lord of Wechel, who obtained the feudal rights of the Land of Turnhout (Wechelderzande-Vlimmeren, Lille, Gierle, Beerse-Vosselaar) from Philip IV Duke of Brabant in 1626.

In the forests of Blommerschot stands a former hunting pavilion (Castle of Blommerschot), and a Chapel of Our Lady of Lourdes (1900). The Cross of Blommerschot, located at Pulderbos, commemorates Léon Nève de Mévergnies (La Hulpe, 20 July 1848–Ghent, 26 January 1934).

See also
 Salphen

References

Sources
 Malle history

Populated places in Antwerp Province
Malle